Ulrich Paul Strauss (January 10, 1920 – August 7, 2015) was an American chemist. He was professor emeritus at Rutgers University. Strauss received a Guggenheim Fellowship in 1971.

Biography 
Strauss was born in Frankfurt. He earned a B.A. from Columbia University and a Ph.D. from Cornell University. He finished his postdoc at Yale University before embarking a teaching a career at Rutgers University, where he taught from 1948 to 1990. Strauss' specialty was polyelectrolytes and he created prefabricated soap micelles known as "polysoaps."

Strauss died on August 7, 2015, at age 95 at his home in Highland Park, New Jersey.

References 

1920 births
2015 deaths
Rutgers University faculty
American chemists
Columbia College (New York) alumni
Cornell University alumni
Scientists from Frankfurt